Walvis Bay International Airport  is an airport serving Walvis Bay, a town in the Erongo Region of Namibia.

Walvis Bay International Airport handled more than 98,178 passengers, and logged over 20 000 aircraft movements in 2015.

History
Established as AFB Rooikop, a South African Air Force station (and later as a base) that closed in 1994. It was home to several SAAF squadrons:
 16 Squadron SAAF: 1939–1940
 27 Squadron SAAF: 1940s
In April 2018, Westair Aviation flies scheduled services to six new destinations in Namibia and South Africa.

Due to flight performance and headwinds, Airlink in March 2019 has decided to re-direct its technical fuel-stop in Windhoek to Walvis Bay International Airport, a move which would accommodate more passengers on the final leg to Saint Helena Airport. The airline has resumed its Johannesburg-service to the island in late March 2022, again landing in Walvis Bay briefly for re-fueling purposes.

Facilities
The facility complies with International Civil Aviation Organisation (ICAO) standards. Also included with the rehabilition of the airport was the construction of a polymer perimeter fence which protects the facility from coastal weather conditions. This addition was the first of its kind for the country.

Upgrades
Since 2007, the airport has received upgrades to its air traffic control equipment, instrument landing systems, and runway lighting, as well as a runway extension at both ends.

The Walvis Bay Airport hub was set to become the country's second international airport during 2016.
The airport provides air freight services, bonded warehouses, cold storage warehouse, space storage depots, freight handling facilities and any service-related industries normally associated with airports.

The new airport features a Category 3C runway, and despite shortening the runway, it is still able to accommodate larger equipment such as the Boeing 737-200. The newly installed avionics (lighting) and landing system allows aircraft movements during poor weather conditions. This feature has placed Walvis Bay Airport at the forefront of airport technology in Southern Africa, especially where coastal, overcast conditions prevail. Namibia Airports Company (NAC) upgraded the facility, which has the capacity to handle 200 passengers an hour and one million passengers a year. The new terminal, which has been inaugurated in July 2016, meets international standards in terms of operational safety/security and functional efficiency, as well as cargo processing.

Airlines and destinations
The following airlines operate regular scheduled services at the airport:

See also
List of airports in Namibia
Transport in Namibia

References

External links

 
OurAirports - Walvis Bay

Airports in Namibia
Buildings and structures in Walvis Bay